The Miss Texas Teen USA competition is the pageant that selects the representative for the state of Texas in the Miss Teen USA pageant. This pageant is part of the Miss USA organization, owned by Texas native Crystle Stewart, who was Miss USA for 2008.

Texas is in the top 5 most successful states at Miss Teen USA in terms of number and value of placements. Alongside Oregon they are the only two states to have produced three winners.

Chanel Williams of San Antonio was crowned Miss Texas Teen USA 2022 on July 3, 2022, at Hilton Houston Post Oak in Houston. She will represent Texas for the title of Miss Teen USA 2022.

Background
Texas's best performance came in the 1980s, where they placed in all but one year and were runners-up on five occasions. Despite this, they still placed second to New York in that decade in terms of number and value of placements. Despite being on top overall, Texas has never been the best state in any particular decade.

Texas is one of the most successful states across all thirty-seven years of competition at Miss Teen USA. They have had seventeen semi-finalists, three more than any other state. They have won the crown three times (along with Oregon), in 1996 when Christie Lee Woods took the title (Woods later went on to star in The Amazing Race 5 and The Amazing Race 31) and 15 years later in 2011 when Danielle Doty won. Karlie Hay became the third Texan entrant to win the crown in 2016. Texas and the state of Oregon are the only states to have won Miss Teen USA three times. Texas has also won several awards, including Miss Photogenic in 2010.

While a number of Texas teens have competed for the Miss Texas USA title, only six have won both pageants. The most successful of these was Nicole O'Brian, who placed 1st runner-up at Miss Teen USA and 2nd runner-up at Miss USA. O'Brien also competed alongside Woods on The Amazing Race 5. Woods was the first Miss Teen USA to not win a Miss title on her first attempt, and despite competing in a number of years never won the Miss Texas USA crown.

Results summary

Placements
Miss Teen USAs: Christie Lee Woods (1996), Danielle Doty (2011), Karlie Hay (2016)
1st runners-up: Becky Pestana (1986), Nicole O'Brian (2000)
2nd runners-up: Landry Davis (2021)
3rd runners-up: Konae Wehle (1985), Kristi Wright (1989), Katherine Perello (2001)
4th runners-up: Sheri Scholz (1983), Charlene Molinar (1984) 
Top 6: Becky Fisher (1990)
Top 10: Libby Pelton (1988), Christie Cole (1998), Misty Giles (1999)
Top 12: Kara Williams (1991)
Top 15: Tye Felan (2003), Magen Ellis (2004), Kellie Stewart (2014), Chloe Kembel (2015), Kirby Lindley (2017)
Texas holds a record of 21 placements at Miss Teen USA.

Awards
Style Award: Andria Mullins (1997)
Swimsuit award: Nicole O'Brian (2000), Katherine Perello (2001)
Miss Photogenic: Chelsea Morgensen (2010)

Winners 

1 Age at the time of the Miss Teen USA pageant

References

External links
Official website

Texas
Women in Texas